Robert Leroy Bowman (May 10, 1930 – January 27, 2017) was an American professional baseball right fielder and pinch hitter, who played all or part of five seasons in Major League Baseball (MLB) for the Philadelphia Phillies (1955–1959). Late in his career, Bowman saw action as a relief pitcher, as well. He batted and threw right-handed, standing  and weighing , during his playing days.

Bowman attended Abraham Lincoln High School (San Jose, California) and played right field for the Phillies from 1955 to 1958 and was noted for his strong throwing arm. The Phillies briefly tried converting Bowman to pitcher in 1959 when they were short arms in the bull pen. He made his first appearance pitching against the Pittsburgh Pirates on August 28. Bowman's first pitch was hit out by Smoky Burgess, but Bowman went on to pitch the rest of the game with two scoreless innings. He appeared six times overall in the majors. His only decision came on September 18, his final appearance in the major leagues, losing to the Chicago Cubs, 5–4, with Alvin Dark hitting a RBI double to score the winning run in the bottom of the 13th inning. When he returned to the minor leagues in 1960, he also returned to the outfield, pitching just four more times. Bowman holds two major league records with the highest pinch hitting batting average in 1958 and most pitching appearances as a position player with six appearances in 1959.

Bowman died in 2017 in San Jose, California, at the age of 86.

References

External links

Bob Bowman at SABR (Baseball BioProject)
Bob Bowman at Pura Pelota (Venezuelan Professional Baseball League)

1930 births
2017 deaths
Baseball players from California
Buffalo Bisons (minor league) players
Klamath Falls Gems players
Licoreros de Pampero players
Major League Baseball outfielders
Miami Marlins (IL) players
People from Laytonville, California
Philadelphia Phillies players
Salt Lake City Bees players
San Jose State Spartans baseball players
Schenectady Blue Jays players
Spokane Indians players
Syracuse Chiefs players
Toronto Maple Leafs (International League) players
Wilmington Blue Rocks (1940–1952) players